Natalie Chriselda Tanasa (born December 22, 1993) is an Indonesian former wushu taolu athlete.

She won two gold medals and one bronze medal at the 2018 World University Championships in Macau, China. She won bronze medal at the 2013 Southeast Asian Games in Duilian discipline, with her partner Thalia Lovita Sosrodjojo. In 2021 she won one gold medal and one bronze medal at the National Sports Week.

References

1993 births
Living people
Sportspeople from Surabaya
Indonesian sportspeople of Chinese descent
Indonesian wushu practitioners
Southeast Asian Games bronze medalists for Indonesia
Southeast Asian Games medalists in wushu
Competitors at the 2013 Southeast Asian Games